The Oxford Hills Comprehensive High School (OHCHS)  is a public high school in South Paris, Maine, a census-designated place (CDP) located within the town of Paris in Oxford County, Maine, United States. Part of the Oxford Hills School District (MSAD 17), the school serves the towns of Paris, Oxford, Norway, West Paris, Waterford, Hebron, Harrison and Otisfield.

History
Oxford Hills High School was founded in 1961 as part of a consolidation plan statewide for small schools. It combined Norway High School and Paris High School, then crosstown rivals. The school operated in the previous school buildings until 1966–67, when a new school was built nearby. In 1998, the school integrated local technical classes and the core curriculum, creating the current institution.

Oxford Hills is also the home of the original Project Graduation. A graduation event started in 1980 after seven instances of alcohol and drug-related deaths after the 1979 graduation.

In 1998, Oxford Hills' school district, MSAD 17, became part of the Oxford Hills Higher Educational Initiative.

Notable alumni

Joe Perham, comedian

References

External links

Maine Department of Education
National Center for Education Statistics
 U.S. News & World Report Rankings
Maine School Administrative District 17 (MSAD 17)

Schools in Oxford County, Maine
Educational institutions established in 1961
Public high schools in Maine
1961 establishments in Maine
Paris, Maine